This is a list of electricity-generating power stations in the U.S. state of Oregon, sorted by type and name. In 2019, Oregon had a total summer capacity of 16,787 MW through all of its power plants, and a net generation of 62,258 GWh.  The corresponding electrical energy generation mix was 48.7% hydroelectric, 33.7% natural gas, 10.6% wind, 4.1% coal, 1.5% biomass, 1.1% solar, and 0.3% geothermal.  Small-scale solar, including customer-owned photovoltaic panels, delivered an additional net 227 GWh to the state's electrical grid.  This compares as about one-third of the amount generated by Oregon's utility-scale photovoltaic plants.

During 2019, Oregon was one of the top-five U.S. states in its share of renewable electricity generation.  It was the second largest generator of hydroelectric power after the state of Washington. Oregon ranks third in the nation behind California and Nevada for its geothermal generation potential.

Nuclear power stations
The Trojan Nuclear Power Plant generated 1,095 MW of electricity during years 1976-1992.  Decommissioning and removal of the nuclear components was completed in 2006.  Oregon had no utility-scale plants that used fissile material as a fuel in 2019.

Fossil-fuel power stations
Data from the U.S. Energy Information Administration serves as a general reference.

Natural gas

Renewable power stations
Data from the U.S. Energy Information Administration serves as a general reference.
See also the Oregon Department of Energy's Renewable Energy Resources Page.

Hydroelectric

Wind

Biomass

Geothermal

Solar

Former facilities

See also 

Energy in Oregon
Pacific DC Intertie
Celilo Converter Station
Path 15
Lists of Oregon-related topics

References

 
Lists of buildings and structures in Oregon
Oregon